Francis Saunders (1513/14–1585), of Welford, Northamptonshire, was an English politician.

Family
Saunders was the son of William Saunders and Dorothy née Young, a daughter of John Young of Croome D'Abitot, Worcestershire. Saunders was the half-brother of the Master of Requests Walter Haddon, and of the reforming cleric James Haddon. He was educated at the Middle Temple. His first marriage was to Elizabeth Carew, a daughter of George Carew, probably of Bury St. Edmunds, Suffolk. They had two sons and a daughter. His second marriage was to Helen Chaloner, daughter of Roger Chaloner of London and the widow of Thomas Farnham of Stoughton and Quorndon, Leicestershire; they probably had one son. His third marriage was to Frances née Pope, with whom he had one son and four daughters.

Career
He was a Member (MP) of the Parliament of England for Brackley in 1547 and March 1553.

References

1510s births
1585 deaths
People from Welford, Northamptonshire
Members of the Middle Temple
English MPs 1547–1552
English MPs 1553 (Edward VI)